A list of films produced in the United Kingdom in 1992 (see 1992 in film):

1992

See also
 1992 in film
 1992 in British music
 1992 in British radio
 1992 in British television
 1992 in the United Kingdom
 List of 1992 box office number-one films in the United Kingdom

References

External links

1992
Films
British